The fou (缶 or 缻; pinyin: fǒu) is an ancient Chinese percussion instrument consisting of a pottery or bronzeware crock, jar, pot, or similar vessel, which was struck with a stick. Its origin dates back to the Xia or Shang dynasties, where it was used in ritual music. It later became a standard instrument in Confucian ritual ensembles.

It made its modern appearance during the 2008 Summer Olympics Opening Ceremony in Beijing. Towards the beginning of the ceremony, 2,008 dancer/percussionists staged a synchronized presentation, striking large square  with glowing red sticks.photo Those instruments had a white square LED array surrounding each drum, allowing them all to produce both music and a dazzling display, which included Chinese characters and shapes created in tandem.

The Chinese character  (缶 or 缻) is used to refer to containers. The character has fallen into disuse in Chinese; however, it is still used to refer to cans in Japanese. Since the Xia and Shang dynasties, some types of those containers were used as musical instruments known as "percussion fou" (击缶). Since its publicity, there has been some scholarly disputes on whether the  used during the Olympics were actually musical instruments, as they could simply have been containers.

References

External links
Instrumental in spreading the word, China Daily
The Square Drum Used in the Opening Ceremony of the Beijing Olympic Game
Bronze ritual vessels
Photo of  used in 2008 Summer Olympics opening ceremony

Chinese musical instruments